The Brazilian Basketball Confederation (Portuguese: Confederação Brasileira de Basketball, CBB), also known as Basketball Brazil (Portuguese: Basquete Brasil), is the governing body of basketball in Brazil. The confederation represents Brazil in FIBA and FIBA Americas competitions. It organizes and oversees the Men's National Basketball Team and the Women's National Basketball Team. Since 2017, former national basketball player Guy Peixoto is the president. CBB contains 720 registered clubs, 36,000 licensed female players, 96,000 licensed male players, and 42,000 unlicensed players.

The senior men's Brazilian national basketball team, which is governed by the CBB, is currently ranked number 11 in the world by FIBA.

History
The CBB has been affiliated with FIBA since 1935. It previously ran the original top-tier level men's professional basketball league in Brazil, the Campeonato Brasileiro de Basquete (Brazilian Basketball Championship).

See also
Brazilian Basketball Championship

References

External links
CBB official website 
FIBA Brazil
History of Brazilian basketball 

Basketball governing bodies in South America
Basketball in Brazil
Brazil
Basketball
1935 establishments in Brazil